Fuscolachnum is a genus of fungi within the Hyaloscyphaceae family. The genus contains 7 species.

References

External links
Fuscolachnum at Index Fungorum

Hyaloscyphaceae